The Somalia women's national basketball team represents Somalia in international competitions. It is administrated by Somali Basketball Federation.

History 
In 2006, the Somali Islamic Courts Union (ICU) which briefly ruled Somalia imposed a ban on women's sports.

2011 Pan Arab Games 
On 8 December 2011, the Somalia women's national basketball team had a 90–24 loss to the Egypt women's national basketball team in the Pan Arab Games at Doha. The Somali team trained at the Mogadishu Police Academy. Despite being the second most popular sport in Somalia, women's participation in basketball was opposed by some. The women had to travel to their training in burkas, playing their games in tracksuits with towels covering their heads. The team received death threats from Islamic extremist group Al-Shaabab.

On 12 December 2011, Somalia won against hosts Qatar 67–57, in what CNN called a "hotly contested match". Others noted that the victory had put Somali women "on par with football" in opposing the suppression of sports for both men and women.

Key players 
Player Manal Cali received an award at an event in London organised by the Somali Federation of Sports Associations for her role in the team.

References

External links
Somalia Basketball Records at FIBA Archive
Somali Women National Team – Presentation on Afrobasket.com
Somali National Basketball Team – Presentation on Facebook

Women's national basketball teams
Basketball
Basketball in Somalia
Basketball teams in Somalia